The Gunn Peaks are isolated peaks  east of Mount Vang in southern Palmer Land, Antarctica. They were mapped by the United States Geological Survey from ground surveys and U.S. Navy air photos, 1961–67, and were named by the Advisory Committee on Antarctic Names for Robert C. Gunn, a glaciologist at Byrd Station, summer 1965–66.

References

Mountains of Palmer Land